Nancy Spero (August 24, 1926 – October 18, 2009) was an American visual artist. Born in Cleveland, Ohio, Spero lived for much of her life in New York City. She married and collaborated with artist Leon Golub. As both artist and activist, Nancy Spero had a career that spanned fifty years. She is known for her continuous engagement with contemporary political, social, and cultural concerns. Spero chronicled wars and apocalyptic violence as well as articulating visions of ecstatic rebirth and the celebratory cycles of life. Her complex network of collective and individual voices was a catalyst for the creation of her figurative lexicon representing women from prehistory to the present in such epic-scale paintings and collage on paper as Torture of Women (1976), Notes in Time on Women (1979) and The First Language (1981). In 2010, Notes in Time was posthumously reanimated as a digital scroll in the online magazine Triple Canopy. Spero has had a number of retrospective exhibitions at major museums.

Early years

Spero was born in Cleveland, Ohio in 1926. A year later her family moved to Chicago, where she grew up. After graduating from New Trier High School, she studied at the School of the Art Institute of Chicago, and graduated in 1949. Among Spero's peers at the Art Institute was a young GI who had returned from service in World War II, Leon Golub.  Spero and Golub exhibited at the Hyde Park Art Center in Chicago as part of the group the Monster Roster. After graduating from the Art Institute of Chicago, Spero continued to study painting in Paris at the École nationale supérieure des Beaux-Arts and at the Atelier of Andre Lhote, an early Cubist painter, teacher and critic. Soon after her return to the United States in 1950, she married Leon Golub, and the two artists settled in Chicago.

From 1956 to 1957, Spero and Golub lived and collaborated in Italy, while raising their three sons. Spero and Golub were equally committed to exploring a modernist representation of the human form, with its narratives and art historical resonances, even as Abstract Expressionism was becoming the dominant idiom. In Florence and Ischia, Spero became intrigued by the format, style and mood of Etruscan and Roman frescoes and sarcophagi which would have influence on her later work. Finding a more varied, inclusive and international atmosphere in Europe than in the New York art world of the time, Spero and her family moved to Paris, living there from 1959 to 1964. Spero's third son was born in Paris, and the artist had major solo exhibitions in Paris at Galerie Breteau in 1962, 1964, and 1968. During this period, Spero painted a series titled Black Paintings depicting themes including mothers and children, lovers, prostitutes, and hybrid, human-animal forms. This collection of works has a more personal meaning for her, rather than political.

Later years

Spero and Golub returned to New York in 1964, where the couple remained to live and work. The Vietnam War was raging and the Civil Rights Movement was exploding. Affected by images of the war broadcast nightly on television and the unrest and violence evident in the streets, Spero began her War Series from 1966 to 1970. These small gouache and inks on paper, executed rapidly, represented the obscenity and destruction of war. The War Series is among the most sustained and powerful group of works in the genre of history painting that condemns war and its real and lasting consequences.

An activist and early feminist, Spero was a member of the Art Workers Coalition (1968–69), Women Artists in Revolution (1969), and Ad Hoc Committee of Women Artists (1971) the work of which developed into the first women's cooperative gallery, A.I.R. Gallery (Artists in Residence) in SoHo, of which she was a founding member. It was during this period that Spero completed her "Artaud Paintings" (1969–70), finding her artistic "voice" and developing her signature scroll paintings, the Codex Artaud (1971–1972), in which she directly quoted the writings of the poet and playwright Antonin Artaud. Uniting text and image, printed on long scrolls of paper, glued end-to-end and tacked on the walls of A.I.R., Spero violated the formal presentation, choice of valued medium and scale of framed paintings. Although her collaged and painted scrolls were Homeric in both scope and depth, the artist shunned the grandiose in content as well as style, relying instead on intimacy and immediacy, while also revealing the continuum of shocking political realities underlying enduring myths. In a 2008 interview in The Brooklyn Rail with publisher Phong Bui, Spero says of her early identification with Artaud: "For me, the spoken words were part of the body, as if whatever I was trying to paint, and my own awareness of pain and anger—you can call it the destruction of the self—was an integral part, that duality. Things get split up right in the middle, which I was very much interested in at that moment in my life."

In 1974, Spero chose to focus on themes involving women and their representation in various cultures. Her Torture in Chile (1974) and the long scroll, Torture of Women (1976, 20 inches x 125 feet), interweave oral testimonies with images of women throughout history, linking the contemporary governmental brutality of Latin American dictatorships (from Amnesty International reports) with the historical repression of women. Spero re-presented previously obscured women's histories, cultural mythology, and literary references with her expressive figuration. Rarely exhibited, Torture of Women was translated into book form in 2009.

Spero manifested a desire for women to be a part of the art conversation. Spero's most mature work lives along the lines of a peinture feminine. This is when a woman is the subject as well as the "artistic consciousness". Spero's open-ended, thought provoking compositions of ruthless uncomfortable subject matter was depicted in hangings and friezes. This is seen in Helicopter, Victim, Astronaut, made in 1968 of gouache and ink on paper. Spero uses the crimes and assaults on women from all eras and cultures to provide intense and emotional imagery for her art and text. Political violence, sexism, and life-threatening situations that women endure are subjects she explored throughout her career, but especially in the 1960s and 19702. These interests are evidence of Spero's conviction that "the personal and the political are indistinguishable." Spero was influenced by Jean Dubuffet, Antonin Artaud, Simone de Beauvoir; and Hélène Cixous.

Developing a pictographic language of body gestures and motion, a bodily hieroglyphics, Spero reconstructed the diversity of representations of women from pre-history to the present. From 1976 through 1979, she researched and worked on Notes in Time on Women, a 20 inch by 210 foot paper scroll. She elaborated and amplified this theme in The First Language (1979–81, 20 inches by 190 feet), eschewing text altogether in favor of an irregular rhythm of painted, hand-printed, and collaged figures, thus creating her "cast of characters." In 1983, Spero began using, in her large scroll paintings, an exuberantly vaginal female figure going by the name of Sheela-na-gig. The acknowledgement of Spero's international status as a preeminent figurative and feminist artist was signaled in 1987 by her traveling retrospective exhibitions in the United States and United Kingdom. By 1988, she developed her first wall installations. For these installations, Spero extended the picture plane of the scrolls by moving her printed images directly onto the walls of museums and public spaces.

Harnessing a capacious imaginative energy and a ferocious will, Spero continued to mine the full range of power relations. In 1987, following retrospective exhibitions in the United Kingdom, the United States and Canada, the artist created images that leapt from the scroll surface to the wall surface, refiguring representational forms of women over time and engaging in a dialogue with architectural space. Spero's wall paintings in Chicago, Vienna, Dresden, Toronto, and Derry form poetic reconstructions of the diversity of representations of women from the ancient to the contemporary world, validating a subjectivity of female experience.

Spero expressed her art once in this way: "I've always sought to express a tension in form and meaning in order to achieve a veracity. I have come to the conclusion that the art world has to join us, women artists, not we join it. When women are in leadership roles and gain rewards and recognition, then perhaps 'we' (women and men) can all work together in art world actions."

Nancy Spero died of heart failure in Manhattan on October 18, 2009. She is buried in Green-Wood Cemetery, in Brooklyn, New York.

She was interviewed for the 2010 film !Women Art Revolution.

Exhibitions
Her works were exhibited:

2018
 Scenes from the Collection (The Jewish Museum, New York, United States)
2017
 Maypole: Take No Prisoners (Galerie Lelong, New York, United States)
2016
 Monster Roster: Existentialist Art in Postwar Chicago (The University of Chicago, Chicago, United States)
 Walk the Line: Drawing Thought in Contemporary Art (Bernal Espacio Galería, Madrid, Spain)
 Art From Elsewhere (International Contemporary Art from UK Galleries Towner, Eastbourne, United Kingdom)
2015
 Painting 2.0: Expression in the Information Age (Museum Brandhorst, Munich, Germany)
 Trio (Galerie Lelong, Paris, France)
 Love Affair With Graphics. From Albers To Vostell (National Museum in Kraków, Kraków, Poland)
 Women's Work: Feminist Art from the Collection (Smith College Museum of Art, Northampton, Massachusetts, United States)
 Art From Elsewhere (Middlesbrough Institute of Contemporary Art, Middlesbrough, United Kingdom)
 Revue 25 (Christine König Galerie, Vienna, Austria)
 Remembering the Vietnam War (The William Benton Museum of Art, Storrs, Connecticut, United States)
 Normal Love (Barbara Gross Galerie, Munich, Germany)
2014
 What's In and What's Not (Anthony Reynolds Gallery, London, United Kingdom)
 Artevida (Política) (Museu de Arte Moderna Rio de Janeiro, Rio de Janeiro, Brazil)
 The Shape of Things (Jack Shainman Gallery, New York City, New York, United States)
  Civilization (Anthony Reynolds Gallery, London, united Kingdom)
 Draw Me a Sheep (Galerie Gabrielle Maubrie, Paris, France)
 L'Heure Des Sorcières (Centre d'Art Contemporain de Quimper, le Quartier, Quimper, France)
 Nancy Spero, The Body (International Centre of Graphic Arts (MGLC), Ljubljana, Slovenia)
2013
 AMERICANA  (Perez Art Museum Miami, Miami, Florida, United States)
 Macho Man, Tell It To My Heart: Collected by Julie Ault (Artists Space, New York City, New York, United States)
 Etwas Eigenes. 25 Jahre Barbara Gross Galerie (Barbara Gross Galerie, Munich, Germany)
 1813. Asedio, Incendio y Reconstrucción de San Sebastián (Museo San Telmo, San Sebastián, Spain)
 Sweet Home (Häusler Contemporary, Munich, Germany)
 Memphis Social (Apexart, New York City, NY)
 Salon du Dessin 2013 (Galerie de France, Paris)
 Feminist Art Then And Now (Katherine E. Nash Gallery, University of Minnesota, Minneapolis, Minnesota, United States)
 Nancy Spero: Towards Liberation (Virginia Commonwealth University Arts, Anderson Gallery, Richmond Virginia, United States)
 Nancy Spero: Cri du Coeur (Worcester Art Museum, Worcester, Massachusetts, United States)
 From Victimage to Liberation: Works from the 1980s & 1990s (Galerie Lelong, New York, New York City, New York, United States)
2012
 The Female Gaze: Women Artists Making Their World (Pennsylvania Academy of the Fine Arts, Philadelphia, Pennsylvania, United States)
 Feminage: The Logic of Feminist Collage (The Cross Art Projects, Sydney, Australia)
 Die Frau in der Pop Art im Echo anderer Stilrichtungen (QuadrART Dornbirn, Dornbirn, Austria)
 Twisted Sisters (DODGE Gallery, New York City, New York, United States)
 Restless (Adelaide International Gallery 13, The Anne & Gordon Samstag Museum of Art, Adelaide, Australia)
 Spirits of Internationalism (MuHKA Museum voor Hedendaagse Kunst Antwerpen, Antwerp, Belgium)
2011
 Body Gesture (Elizabeth Leach Gallery, Portland, Oregon, United States)
 Neue Künstlerinnenräume (K21 Ständehaus, Düsseldorf, Germany)
 Leon Golub, Nancy Spero (Galeria Pilar Serra, Madrid, Spain)
 Heroines (Museo Thyssen Bornemisza, Madrid, Spain)
 Pictures of the Body (Pennsylvania Academy of the Fine Arts, Philadelphia, Pennsylvania, United States)
 New Inventory (Andrew Rafacz Gallery, Chicago, Illinois, United States)
 Nancy Spero (Serpentine Gallery, Londres, United Kingdom)
 Nancy Spero: Works Of The 1980s (Barbara Gross Galerie, Munich, Germany)
 Centre Georges Pompidou, Paris, France

2010
 Shifting the Gaze (The Jewish Museum, New York, United States)
 l'Image et le Mot (Galerie Chantal Bamberger, Strasbourg, Germany)
 Love in Vein: Editions Fawbush Projects & Artists 2005-2010 (Gering & López Gallery, New York City, New York, Un,tates)
 The Right to Protest (Museum on the Seam, Jerusalem, Israel)
 Woman in Motion (Galerie Lelong, Paris, France)
 Nancy Spero (Musée National d´Art Moderne, Paris)

2009
 Nancy Spero, Woman as Protagonist (Museum der Moderne Salzburg Mönchsberg, Salzburg, Austria)
 Nancy Spero, Un Coup de Dent (Galerie Lelong, New York City, New York, United States)
 Nancy Spero. Disidanzas (Centro Andaluz de Arte Contemporáneo (CAAC), Sevilla, Spain)
 Blue (Studio Stefania Miscetti, Rome, Italy)

2008
 Nancy Spero (Anthony Reynolds Gallery, London, United Kingdom)
 Nancy Spero. Dissidances (Museo Nacional Centro de Arte Reina Sofia, Madrid, Spain)
 Nancy Spero, Spero Speaks (de Appel Boys' School, Amsterdam, Netherlands)

2007
 Nancy Spero (Normandie, Sotteville les Rouen, France)
 Nancy Spero (Galerie Lelong, Paris, France)
2006
 Nancy Spero (Franco Soffiantino Gallery, Turin, Italy)
2005
 Louise Bourgeois, Kiki Smith, Nancy Spero (Galeria Pilar Serra, Madrid, Spain)
 Nancy Spero (Crown Gallery, Brussels, Belgium)
 Tattoo (Overtones, Los Angeles, California, United States)
 Toward the Future (Hiroshima City Museum of Contemporary Art, Hiroshima, Japan)

2004
 Nancy Spero (Galerie Lelong, Paris, France)

2003
 Nancy Spero (Galerie Lelong, New York, United States)

2002
 Nancy Spero, A Continuous Present (Kunsthalle zu Kiel, Kiel, Germany)
 Galerie Lelong, New York, United States

2001
 l'Image Parlée, The Spoken Image (Université du Québec à Montréal, Montréal, Québec)
 Nancy Spero (Barbara Gross Galerie, Munich, Germany)
 Sheela Does Ramapo (Ramapo College Art Galleries, Mahwah, New Jersey, United States)

2000
 The Museum of Modern Art, New York, United States
1998
 Tate Gallery, Londres, United Kingdom
 Museo Jacobo Borges, Carcass, Venezuela

1997
 Nancy Spero: Collages (Rhona Hoffman Gallery, Chicago, Illinois, United States)
1994
 Nancy Spero (Malmö Konsthall, Malmö, Sweden)
 The Institute of Contemporary Art, Boston, United States
 List Visual Arts Center, Massachusetts Institute of Technology, Cambridge, United States
1993
 National Gallery, Ottawa, Canada

1992
 Museum of Modern Art, New York, United States

1991
 Sky Goddess, Egyptian Acrobat (Studio Stefania Miscetti, Rome, Italy)
 Nancy Spero (Barbara Gross Galerie, Munich, Germany)
1990
 Nancy Spero (Bonner Kunstverein, Bonn, Germany)
 Nancy Spero, Bilder 1958 to 1990 (Der Ort internationaler Gegenwartskunst in Berlin, Berlin, Germany)
 Nancy Spero,  To Soar II,  March 1 - May 20, 1990 (Smith College Museum of Art, Northampton, MA)

1988
 Nancy Spero (The Museum of Contemporary Art, Los Angeles, United States)
1987
 Nancy Spero: Works Since 1950 (Everson Museum, Syracuse, N.Y.)
1984
 Nancy Spero, The Black Paintings (The Renaissance Society, University of Chicago, Chicago United States)
 Nancy Spero, MATRIX 72 (The University of California, Berkeley Art Museum and Pacific Film Archive)

Honors
2006
 Elected a member of the American Academy of Arts and Letters.
2005
 Lifetime Achievement Award from the College Art Association
2003
 Honor Award from the Women's Caucus for Art
1995
 Hiroshima Art Prize (awarded jointly to Spero and Golub) from the Hiroshima City Museum of Contemporary Art
1995
 Skowhegan Medal from the Skowhegan School of Painting and Sculpture

Media appearances
 Spero as herself, Nancy Spero: Becoming an Artist, 2008
 Spero as herself, !Women Art Revolution, 2010
 Spero as herself, Nancy Spero: Collaboration, 2012
 Spero as herself, Nancy Spero: Paper Mirror, 2019

See also
 Chicago Imagists
 Feminist art movement in the United States

References

Sources
 Arkesteijn, Roel, Codex Spero. Nancy Spero Selected Writing and Interviews 1950-2008. Roma Publications, 2008. 
 Bird, Jon ed., Otherworlds: The Art of Nancy Spero and Kiki Smith (London: Reaktion Books, Ltd., 2003)
 Bird, Jon, Jo Anna Isaak, and Sylvere Lotringer, Nancy Spero (London: Phaidon Press Limited, 1996)
 Bird, Jon and Lisa Tickner, Nancy Spero, exhib. cat. (London: Institute of Contemporary Arts, 1987)
 Breerette, Geneviève, Spero, The Paris Black Paintings, 2007
 Buchloh, Benjamin, "Spero's Other Traditions", in: Inside the Visible, edited by Catherine de Zegher, MIT Press, 1996
 Frizzell, Deborah, “Nancy Spero’s War Maypole: Take No Prisoners”, Cultural Politics v. 5, no. 1 (March 2009)
 Frizzell, Deborah, "Nancy Spero's Museum Incursions: Isis on the Threshold," Woman's Art Journal v. 27, no.2 (Fall/Winter 2006)
 Frizzell, Deborah, "Nancy Spero's Installations and Institutional Incursions, 1987-2001; Dialogues Within the Museum, and Elsewhere," (Ph.D. Dissertation, Graduate Center of CUNY, 2004)
 Frizzell, Deborah and Susanne Altmann, Nancy Spero: A Continuous Present, exhib. cat. (Kiel, Germany: Kunsthalle zu Kiel and the University of Kiel, 2002)
 Harris, Susan, Nancy Spero, exhib. cat. (Malmö: Malmö Konsthall, 1994)
 Harris, Susan, Nancy Spero: Weighing the Heart Against a Feather of Truth (Spain: Santiago de Compostela, Centro Galego de Arte Contemporanea, 2005)
 
 Jewish Women's Archive Nancy Spero page
 Julian, Linda ed., Nancy Spero, 1993 Emrys Journal, exhib. cat. (Greenville, South Carolina: Greenville County Museum of Art, 1993)
 Lyon, Christopher, Nancy Spero: The Work (Munich and New York: Prestel, 2010) 
 Macgregor, Elizabeth A. and Catherine de Zegher, Nancy Spero, exhib. cat., (Birmingham, U.K.: Ikon Gallery, 1998)
 Nahas, Dominique ed., Nancy Spero: Works Since 1950, exhib. cat. (Syracuse, New York: Everson Museum of Art, 1987)
 PBS, Biography, interviews, essays, artwork images and video clips from PBS series Art:21 -- Art in the Twenty-First Century  - Season 4 (2007)
 Purdom, Judy, "Nancy Spero and Woman in Performance", in Florence, P. and Foster, N. (eds.), Differential Aesthetics, Ashgate, 2000. 
 Stiles, Kristine and Peter Selz eds., Nancy Spero. "Woman as Protagonist: Interview with Jeanne Siegel", in Theories and Documents of Contemporary Art, Berkeley: University of California Press, 1996, pp. 244–246. 
 Storr, Robert et Leon Golub, The War Series (1966-1970), 2003
 Walker, Joanna S., 'Nancy Spero 1926-2009', Art Monthly, no. 332 (Dec-Jan 09–10)
 Walker, Joanna S., 'An Encounter with Nancy Spero', n.paradoxa, Vol. 24 (July 2009)
 Walker, Joanna S., 'The body is present even if in disguise: tracing the trace in the art work of Nancy Spero and Ana Mendieta', Tate Papers, Issue 11 (Spring 2009). See https://web.archive.org/web/20110109200439/http://www.tate.org.uk/research/tateresearch/tatepapers/09spring/joanna-walker.shtm
 Walker, Joanna S., Review of Nancy Spero's retrospective at MACBA, Art Monthly, no. 320 (October 2008)
 Walker, Joanna S., "Nancy Spero: An Encounter in Three Parts. Performance, Poetry and Dance" (PhD Thesis, University College London, 2008)
 Weskott, Hanne, Nancy Spero in der Glyptothek, Arbeiten auf Papier, 1981–1991, exhib. cat. (Munich: Glyptothek am Koenigsplatz Muenchen, 1991)

External links
 Nancy Spero
 Obituary, NY Times
 Obituary, The Guardian
 Nancy Spero exhibition at the Serpentine Galleries 2011
 Pompidou Centre, exhibition: elles@centrepompidou  2010.
 Interview with Phong Bui in The Brooklyn Rail, Jul/Aug 2008
 Nancy Spero, Christine König Galerie, Vienna, Austria
 Torture of Women at Siglio Press

1926 births
2009 deaths
Artists from Cleveland
20th-century American painters
21st-century American painters
American alumni of the École des Beaux-Arts
American women painters
Jewish American artists
Jewish feminists
American Jews
American contemporary painters
Burials at Green-Wood Cemetery
Feminist artists
Members of the American Academy of Arts and Letters
New Trier High School alumni
School of the Art Institute of Chicago alumni
National Academy of Design members
20th-century American women artists
21st-century American women artists